This is a  list of notable structural engineers, people who were trained in or practised structural engineering and who are notable enough for a Wikipedia article.

See also architect and lists of engineers.

 


B 
 John Baker
 William F. Baker
 Cecil Balmond
 Hannskarl Bandel
 Isambard Kingdom Brunel
 Sarah Buck

C 
 Santiago Calatrava
 Felix Candela
 Jamilur Reza Choudhury
 Joseph Colaco
 Hardy Cross
 Carl Culmann

D 
 Fabrizio de Miranda
 Henry J. Degenkolb
 John Anthony Derrington
 J. Augustine DeSazilly
 Michael Dickson
 Eladio Dieste
 Patrick Dowling
 Peter Thomas Dunican
 H. Kempton Dyson

E 
 Gustave Eiffel
 J. R. Eyerman

F 
 Oscar Faber
 William Fairbairn
 Hilario Fernández Long
 Eugene Figg
 Nicholas Forell
 Eugene Freyssinet

G 
 William George Nicholson Geddes
 William Glanville
 Mike Glover

H 
 Hardy Cross
 Edmund Happold - founder of Buro Happold
 François Hennebique
 Charles Hershfield - co-founder of Morrison Hershfield 
 
 Eaton Hodgkinson
 Michael Horne
 John Howell & Son
 Anthony Hunt
 Charles Husband

I 
 Heinz Isler

K 
 Oleg Kerensky
 Fazlur Rahman Khan
 Maurice Koechlin

L 
 William LeMessurier - founder of LeMessurier Consultants
 Fritz Leonhardt
 Li Guohao
 Ian Liddell
 Tung-Yen Lin

M 
 Robert Maillart
 Mao Yisheng
 Guy Maunsell
 Christian Menn
 Riccardo Morandi
 Carson Morrison - co-founder of Morrison Hershfield

N 
 Pier Luigi Nervi
 David Nethercot
 Frank Newby
 Nathan M. Newmark

O 
 Frei Otto

P 
 Alfred Pugsley
 Nigel Priestley

R 
 Peter Rice
 Leslie E. Robertson

S 
 Kolbjørn Saether
 Jörg Schlaich
 Marc Seguin
 Mark Serrurier
 Vladimir Shukhov
 Alec Skempton
 John Skilling
 Frederick Snow
 Werner Sobek
 Josef Stenbäck
 Robert Stephenson
 Joseph Strauss

T 
 Man-Chung Tang
 Margot Taule
 Eduardo Torroja
 C.A.P. Turner

V 
 Arthur Vierendeel
 Michel Virlogeux

W 
 John Waddell
 Faith Wainwright
 Arnold Waters
 André Waterkeyn
 Paul Westbury
 Chris Wise

Y 
 Henry T. Yang
 Nabih Youssef

Z 
 Olgierd Zienkiewicz
 Jack Zunz

History of structural engineering
Structural engineers
 

de:Jacques Heyman